The Mission Covenant Church of Sweden, founded in 1878, was a Swedish evangelical free church. It was the second-largest Protestant denomination in Sweden, after the national church, the Church of Sweden. In 2011, the Mission Covenant Church of Sweden completed a merger with two other denominations, resulting in the new denomination Uniting Church in Sweden (in Swedish: Equmeniakyrkan). The denomination is a member of the Swedish Free Church Council, the International Federation of Free Evangelical Churches, and the World Communion of Reformed Churches.

History
The Mission Covenant Church of Sweden is a breakaway from the Lutheran Church of Sweden. As a movement it had roots in Pietism and the spiritual awakenings of the 19th century such as Nyevangelism. When Swedish Covenanters emigrated to the United States and Canada in the last half of the 19th century, they formed the Evangelical Covenant Church. The denominations are independent of each other but have maintained fraternal ties. The forming of the Swedish Mission Covenant was one of the first steps in forming free church denominations in Sweden.

The church sent numerous missionaries to many countries around the world, such as China in the 19th and early 20th centuries, in particular Xinjiang, Japan, India, Russia and Caucasus, Nicaragua, Costa Rica and Ecuador, Alaska, Spain and, in numbers of missionaries the largest field, Democratic Republic of the Congo and the Republic of Congo. In many other countries there were missionary projects.

The church had 61,000 members in 700 congregations in 2009.

Prior to 2003, the Mission Covenant Church was called Svenska Missionsförbundet (literally Swedish Mission Covenant, though the official English name already was Mission Covenant Church of Sweden at that time). The Swedish Salvation Army (Svenska Frälsningsarmén (SFA), which is a separate organisation from the international Salvation Army, which also operates in Sweden) is a non-territorial district of the Mission Covenant Church.

In 2011, the Mission Covenant Church of Sweden completed a long-planned merger with the Baptist Union of Sweden and the United Methodist Church of Sweden. The new denomination was called Joint Future Church, until the new name Equmeniakyrkan (Uniting Church in Sweden) was adopted by the general assembly in May 2013.

Notable members
 Gustaf Ahlbert
 Carl Boberg
 Karl Edvard Laman
 Lars Leijonborg
 Paul Petter Waldenström

See also
Evangelical Covenant Church
University College Stockholm
List of MCCS Missionaries in Chinese Turkestan

References

External links
 Svenska Missionskyrkan - in English
 equmenia is the national federation of the youth organisations of the MCCS, the Swedish Baptist Union and the United Methodist Church in Sweden
 Mission and Revolution in Eastern Turkestan

Reformed denominations in Europe
Christian organizations established in 1878
Members of the World Communion of Reformed Churches
Members of the World Council of Churches
Christian organizations established in the 19th century
Christian missionary societies
1878 establishments in Sweden
Protestantism in Sweden
Religious organizations disestablished in 2012
Christian organizations disestablished in 2012